Alonso de Bazán, son of Admiral Álvaro de Bazán the Elder, Marquis del Viso, and brother of the better known Admiral Álvaro de Bazán, 1st Marquis of Santa Cruz, was a Spanish naval commander during the Anglo–Spanish War (1585–1604) and the Eighty Years' War.

Notable military actions 

In 1588, he should have been part of a second fleet and give support to the Spanish Armada that was trying to invade England. After the failure of that fleet, he transported infantry troops to La Coruña and Lisbon, in preparation of an incoming English counter-offensive.

In 1589, after the failure of the English "Invincible", commanded by Francis Drake, Alonso de Bazan went after the English fleet with his galleys and managed to seize three ships of the retreating Drake's forces off Lisbon.

In 1590, at the start of the Brittany Campaign he transported some Tercio troops from the peninsula to France to help the Catholics in their fight against the French Protestants. 

September 9, 1591, was the date of his greatest military action of his career: the Battle of Flores, where a fleet of 55 vessels he commanded fought and defeated the 22-ship fleet of Thomas Howard, 1st Count of Suffolk, who was trying to capture the Spanish treasure fleet.

In 1594, in the Azores, he defeated another English fleet, led by the Count of Cumberland, that was trying to attack the ships coming from America. 

In 1597, he took part in another victory against the English fleet, the Essex-Raleigh Expedition.

In 1604, he died, being replaced by Admiral Luis Fajardo in his position left as captain general of the Navy of the Ocean Sea.

References

16th-century Spanish people
17th-century Spanish people
Spanish people of the Eighty Years' War
People of the Anglo-Spanish War (1585–1604)